"Whistle" is a song by English DJ Jax Jones and British singer Calum Scott. It was released on 10 February 2023 via Polydor Records.

Credits and personnel
 Jax Jones – musical producer, primary artist, producer, programming
 Calum Scott – vocals

Charts

References

2023 singles
2023 songs
Jax Jones songs
Calum Scott songs
Songs written by Jax Jones
Songs written by Jon Maguire
Song recordings produced by Jax Jones